Crotto may refer to:
Crotto (architecture), a dome-shaped construction in Switzerland and Italy

Crotto is also an Italian surname. It may refer to the following:
 Giuseppe Crotto (1830-1903), Italian merchant and landowner
 José Camilo Crotto (1863-1936), Argentine politician
 Rachel Crotto (born 1958), American chess player

Italian-language surnames